Pablo Fontes (born 27 December 1995) is a Spanish rugby union player. He competed for the Spain national rugby sevens team at the 2016 Summer Olympics. He started his career playing in Club de Rugby Majadahonda and has played in Alcobendas Rugby, Atlético de Madrid Rugby, among other teams.

References

External links
 

1995 births
Living people
Olympic rugby sevens players of Spain
Spain international rugby sevens players
Spanish rugby union players
Male rugby sevens players
Rugby sevens players at the 2016 Summer Olympics